Dean Alan Wendt is an American voice actor, host and music DJ, best known as the fill in voice of Barney on the hit children's show Barney & Friends.

Career
Dean Wendt was a part of Radio Disney from 1996 to 1999 but left the company in order to dedicate his time to voicing Barney the Dinosaur in 2001 after Bob West, David Franks, Duncan Brannan and Tim Dever retired in 2002.

His voice has appeared in various other Barney media, such as concert tours around the world. He has appeared in such shows as Barney's Colorful World and Barney Live! The Let's Go Tour, and Barney's Birthday Bash. He has also appeared in over 100 TV shows and over 25 videos.

Filmography

Barney & Friends:
 2001:
Macy's Thanksgiving Day Parade (November 22)
 2002:
Season 7
 We Are Family
 Barney's Christmas Star (promotional material only)
 2003:
Season 8
 2004:
Season 9
 2006:
Season 6
 Barney's Beach Party (February 7) (uncredited)
Season 10
 2007:
 Season 11
 2008:
 Season 12
 2009:
 Season 13

References

External links
 
 Official website
 Dean Wendt interview on Tommy2.net

American male voice actors
Living people
Radio Disney DJs
21st-century American male actors
American radio DJs
Year of birth missing (living people)